Wuxiang may refer to:

Wuxiang County (武乡县), Changzhi, Shanxi, China
Wuxiang, Ningbo (五乡镇), town in Yinzhou District, Ningbo, Zhejiang, China
Five-spice powder (五香粉), mixture of five spices used in Chinese cuisine